Bundle bone is a histologic term for the portion of the bone of the alveolar process that surrounds teeth and into which the collagen fibers of the periodontal ligament are embedded.  It can also be referred to as alveolar bone proper.

Bundle bone is functionally dependent in that it resorbs following tooth extraction or loss.

References

Bones of the head and neck